The Mark 16 torpedo was a redesign of the United States Navy's standard Mark 14 torpedo in use during World War II. It incorporated war-tested improvements into a weapon designed to be used in unmodified United States fleet submarines. Due to high unit cost and the Mark 14's unreliability issues being solved by mid-1943, they were never put into mass production.

Following WWII, limited numbers of the weapon were produced. The weapon was considered the United States' standard anti-shipping torpedo for twenty years; despite significant numbers of Mark 14 torpedoes left over from wartime production.

The Mod 0 warhead contained  of Torpex (TPX) explosive and at the time was the most powerful conventional submarine torpedo warhead in the world. The TPX explosive in use by the US Navy during WWII was about 75% more powerful by weight (7,405 J/g) than the Japanese Type 95 and Type 97 torpedo explosives (4,370 J/g). As a result, it was even more powerful than the late war "Mod.3" variant of the Type 93 "Long Lance" torpedo; which used 780 kg of the Type 97 explosive, despite the warhead weighing 210 kg (28%) less.

The Mod 1 Variant of the Mk 16 only contained  of TPX explosive but could run around 4,500 yards longer as a result. The torpedo could be set for both straight or patterned running. After World War II, the Mod 0 and Mod 1 variants were developed into a common torpedo. Designed to keep the longer range from Mod 1 and larger warhead of Mod 0, this upgrade was called the Mark 16 Mod 8 and incorporated a 1,260 pound HBX (7,552 J/g) warhead in the place of the TPX. This weapon was used as the US Navy's main anti-ship torpedo until it was phased out in 1972, at which point both the Mark 16 and Mark 37 ASW torpedoes had been fully replaced by the dual-purpose Mark 48 in 1975.

See also
American 21 inch torpedo

Notes

References
Naval Weapons web site: http://www.navweaps.com/Weapons/WTUS_WWII.htm
"Naval Weapons of World War Two" by John Campbell
"Japanese Cruisers of the Pacific War" by Eric Lacroix and Linton Wells II
 

Torpedoes of the United States
Cold War anti-submarine weapons of the United States
World War II weapons of the United States